Cassatella di sant'Agata ( "Saint Agatha's breasts" or minni di virgini "virgin's breasts"), also known as , is a traditional Sicilian pastry from Catania made during the Festival of Saint Agatha.

Origins
The Italian historian Emanuele Ciaceri has claimed that the origins of the dessert may lie with the cults of Isis in ancient Egypt, believing that the cakes were shaped like breasts to honor Isis' role as a mother goddess.

Description
The cakes are shaped like breasts to honor Saint Agatha, the patron saint of Catania, a Catholic martyr who was tortured by having her breasts cut off with pincers. Saint Agatha had taken a vow of virginity and refused to marry the Roman prefect Quintianus, who reported her to the authorities for being a Christian during the Decian persecution.

Cassatella di sant'Agata are round-shaped sweets made with sponge cake soaked in rosolio and stuffed with ricotta, chocolate drops, and candied fruit. The outside is covered in white icing and finished with a candied cherry on top. The ricotta is made strictly from sheep's milk.

See also
Cassata
Catholic Church in Italy
Agatha of Sicily
Sicilian cuisine

References

Breast
Italian cakes
Catania
Catholic cuisine
Catholic Church in Italy
Cuisine of Sicily
Italian desserts
Marzipan
Palermitan cuisine
Sicilian-American cuisine